|}

This is a list of Legislative Council results for the Victorian 1967 state election. 18 of the 35 seats were contested.

Results by province

Ballarat

Bendigo

Boronia 

 Two party preferred vote was estimated.

Doutta Galla

East Yarra 

 Two party preferred vote was estimated.

Gippsland Province

Higinbotham

Melbourne 

 Two party preferred was estimated.

Melbourne North 

 Two party preferred was estimated.

Melbourne West 

 Two party preferred was estimated.

Monash

Northern 

 Preferences were not distributed.

North-Eastern 

 Preferences were not distributed.

North-Western 

 Two party preferred vote was estimated.

South-Eastern

South-Western

Templestowe

Western

See also 

 1967 Victorian state election
 Candidates of the 1967 Victorian state election
 Members of the Victorian Legislative Council, 1967–1970

References 

Results of Victorian state elections
1960s in Victoria (Australia)